Mary Ann Prout (February 14, 1800 or 1801 – 1884) was an African-American educator. Thought to be born in either South River or Baltimore, Maryland, Prout founded a day school in Baltimore in 1830, and taught there until its closure in 1867. She was involved in other humanitarian ventures; a trusteeship of the Gregory Aged Women's Home, president of the local chapter of the National Reform Educational Association, and founded a secret order in 1867 that became the Independent Order of St. Luke, a Black aid organization. Prout died in Baltimore around 1884.

References

1800s births
1884 deaths
African-American educators
Educators from Maryland
19th-century American women educators
19th-century American educators